The Cape Government Railways 0-4-0ST Aid of 1878 was a South African steam locomotive from the pre-Union era in the Cape of Good Hope.

In June 1874, while construction work by the Kowie Harbour Improvement Company was underway at Port Alfred, the Cape Government Railways shipped their  locomotive no. 9 Blackie from Cape Town to Port Alfred for use as construction locomotive. In 1878, when it became necessary to regularly ferry the locomotive from one bank of the Kowie River to the other, a second locomotive was obtained, a  engine named Aid.

Port Alfred harbour
In the middle of the 19th century, Port Alfred at the Kowie River mouth was considered as a possible third major port in the Eastern Cape, in addition to the ports of Port Elizabeth to the southwest and East London to the northeast. In 1857, the Kowie Harbour Improvement Company commenced work to construct embankments and increase the depth of the river mouth. The work was eventually taken over by the Cape Government, who spent more than £800,000 in the attempt to develop the harbour.

In 1874, when the need arose for a construction locomotive on site, the  locomotive no. 9 Blackie, the first locomotive in South Africa, was shipped to Port Alfred by the Cape Government Railways. The engine Blackie, officially named Frontier, was put to work on the west bank of the Kowie river, but as pressure of work demanded, it became necessary to regularly ferry the locomotive from one bank of the Kowie to the other.

Manufacturer
To eliminate the time-consuming tedium of ferrying the locomotive to and fro across the river, an order for a second locomotive was placed through the Crown Agents for the Colonies in 1877. Fox, Walker and Company of Bristol in England supplied an  locomotive which was shipped in two sections and on two brigs, the Frieda and the Lena, which arrived at Port Alfred on 1 January 1878.

Service
The new locomotive, also built for  gauge, was assembled on the east bank of the Kowie and named Aid. It worked at Port Alfred until the harbour construction work was terminated around the turn of the twentieth century, as a result of the continuous silting up of the river mouth which made the project unviable. The engine Aid was then abandoned and left standing in a shed.

Disposal
At some time shortly after the end of the First World War, the engine Aid was stripped down and buried on site. Its remains were exhumed in January 1960 and presented to the museum at Port Elizabeth, where it was intended to rebuild the locomotive to a condition suitable for static exhibition, using dimensional drawings of the engine which had since been discovered.

Nothing came of the restoration plans, however, and the exhumed remains of the locomotive were eventually sold as scrap metal.

References

0060
0060
0-4-0ST locomotives
B locomotives
Fox, Walker locomotives
4 ft 8½ in gauge locomotives
Railway locomotives introduced in 1878
1878 in South Africa
Scrapped locomotives